Alexander Gurov may refer to:

 Alexander Gurov (politician) (born 1945), Russian politician
 Alexander Gurov (boxer) (born 1971), Ukrainian boxer